Through a Telescope is a 1913 silent film comedy short produced by the Eclair American Motion Picture Company and distributed through Universal Film Manufacturing Company. It starred Lamar Johnstone.

This film survives and is preserved in the Library of Congress.

Cast
Lamar Johnstone
Eleanor Parker

References

External links
 Through a Telescope at IMDb.com

1913 films
American silent short films
American black-and-white films
Silent American comedy films
1913 comedy films
1910s American films